Silver perrhenate is a chemical compound with the formula AgReO4. This compound is isostructural with the mineral scheelite (CaWO4). Silver perrhenate reacts with trimethylsilyl chloride to give the silyl "ester" (CH3)3SiOReO3.

References

Silver compounds
Perrhenates